State Highway 53 (SH-53) is a  state highway serving Kootenai County in the U.S. state of Idaho. SH-53 travels northeast from Washington State Route 290 (SR 290) at the Washington state border near Hauser to a short concurrency with SH-41 in Rathdrum. From Rathdrum, the highway continues east to end at U.S. Route 95 (US-95) north of Hayden. The Hauser to Rathdrum segment first appeared on a map in 1926, while the continuation of the route to the Hayden area appeared in 1937, completing an unnumbered state highway. SH-53 was designated in 1953 after all unnumbered state highways were assigned numbers.

Route description

SH-53 begins at the Washington state border southwest of Hauser at the eastern terminus of Washington State Route 290, which serves Spokane, Washington. Trent Road travels northeast, paralleling the Burlington Northern Santa Fe railroad through farmland and several small suburban communities towards Rathdrum. The highway serves the northern area of the city, passing strip malls and businesses, to an intersection with SH-41. At the intersection, SH-53 turns southeast and begins a short concurrency with SH-41 to cross the railroad via an overpass. The highway splits from SH-41 near Lakeland High School and travels due east through a commercial district. From the commercial district, the roadway travels towards farmland and sharply turns north before cutting back southeast over a UPRR railroad line. After the overpass, SH-53 ends at a signalized intersection with US-95 north of Hayden. The Idaho Transportation Department has plans to straighten the east end of the highway and replace the signalized intersection with an interchange by the end of 2020.

History

SH-53 first appeared as a roadway from Hauser to Rathdrum in a 1926 map of Idaho. By 1937, the road was extended east to US-95 north of Hayden and became an unnumbered state highway. The highway was officially designated as SH-53 after a meeting of the Idaho Board of Highway Directors on July 25, 1953 that approved a number for all unnumbered state highways.

Major intersections

References

053
Transportation in Kootenai County, Idaho